Terribacillus halophilus is a Gram-positive, strictly aerobic and non-motile bacterium from the genus of Terribacillus which has been isolated from field soil from Tama in Japan.

References

External links
Type strain of Terribacillus halophilus at BacDive -  the Bacterial Diversity Metadatabase

 

Bacillaceae
Bacteria described in 2007